The Chacra Face Road is one of eight Ancestral Puebloan roads that enters Chaco Canyon, New Mexico. It enters the canyon through a break in the Chacra Mesa called the Fajada Gap, and ends at the great house Una Vida. It probably connected Una Vida to an eastern Puebloan community, Guadalupe Outlier.

References

Bibliography

Archaeological sites in New Mexico
Chaco Canyon
Chaco Culture National Historical Park
Colorado Plateau
Ancestral Puebloans
Post-Archaic period in North America
Native American history of New Mexico